Kwasan Observatory is a Japanese observatory in the Kyoto University founded in 1929. Issei Yamamoto was the first director of the observatory.

References

Astronomical observatories in Japan
Astronomical observatories
Kyoto University